The Wehmer House is a historic building located in Guttenberg, Iowa, United States.  This 1½-story brick structure was built by George Wehmer between 1856 and 1862.  The adjacent lumber yard owned the house by 1900, and it was a private residence again by mid-century.  It was initially built as a duplex with a unit on both side of a shared entrance.  The chimneys located on each side are connected to fireplaces.  The dormers on the front of the side gable roof are not original.  The building was listed on the National Register of Historic Places in 1984.

References

Houses completed in 1862
Houses in Guttenberg, Iowa
Houses on the National Register of Historic Places in Iowa
National Register of Historic Places in Clayton County, Iowa